Pobeda is a rural locality (a village) in Sikiyazsky Selsoviet, Duvansky District, Bashkortostan, Russia. The population was 20 as of 2010. There is 1 street.

Geography 
Pobeda is located 5 km south of Mesyagutovo (the district's administrative centre) by road. Mesyagutovo is the nearest rural locality.

References 

Rural localities in Duvansky District